Medlin is a surname of English (Cornwall) origin. Notable people with the surname include:

Brian Herbert Medlin (1927-2004), Australian philosopher
Dan Medlin (born 1949), American football player
John Medlin (1933–2012), American businessman
Lee Medlin (born 1964), American cyclist
Lex Medlin (born 1969), American actor
Richard Medlin (born 1987), American football player

References

Surnames of English origin